Sweden women's national floorball team represents Sweden in international competitions of women's floorball. The team played their first match in a world championship on 3 May 1997 against Austria in Mariehamn, Finland. The match ended in victory with 32-0 and is still the biggest victory ever in the floorball world championships. The team went unbeaten through the tournament and became the first world champions of women's floorball.

The team has won 10 titles in the world championships, and never missed a medal position. Additionally, the team has won a record eight consecutive titles.

Medal record

All-time world championships results

World championships results against other teams

References

External links 
Sweden at the International Floorball Federation's website
Swedish Floorball Federation

Women's national floorball teams
Floorball